House of Flying Daggers is a 2004 wuxia romance film directed by Zhang Yimou and starring Andy Lau, Zhang Ziyi and Takeshi Kaneshiro. Unlike other wuxia films, it is more of a love story than purely a martial arts film.

The film opened in limited release within the United States on 3 December 2004, in New York City and Los Angeles, and opened on additional screens throughout the country two weeks later. The film grossed $11,050,094 in United States box office, and then went on to significantly overperform in home video market in the United States.

The film was chosen as China's entry for the Academy Award for Best Foreign Language Film for the year 2004, but was not nominated in that category. It did receive a nomination for Best Cinematography.

Plot 
In AD 859, as the Tang Dynasty declines, several rebel groups are established, the largest of which is the House of Flying Daggers, based in Fengtian, who battle the corrupt government that oppresses the people. Its members use special throwing daggers that always hit their targets to steal from the rich and give to the poor, gaining the support of the locals. Two police officers, Leo (Andy Lau) and Jin (Takeshi Kaneshiro), are ordered to kill the leader of the group within ten days, a task that appears to be impossible as no one knows who the leader of the House of the Flying Daggers is.

To accomplish this, Leo arrests Mei (Zhang Ziyi), a blind dancer who is suspected of being the previous leader's daughter. Jin proceeds to assault the jail and set Mei free, pretending that he is a rebel sympathizer, an act which gains Mei's trust. As Mei and Jin travel to the Flying Dagger headquarters, Leo trails behind with reinforcements. Unfortunately, Mei and Jin fall in love.

To make the deception more realistic, Leo and his policemen pretend to ambush the pair. Later, though, they are ambushed for real by soldiers. At a secret meeting, Leo explains that the military has gotten involved and wants Jin and Mei dead. A few days later, Jin and Mei are ambushed again in a bamboo forest and almost killed, but they are saved by the House of Flying Daggers and taken to their headquarters. At this point, Mei is revealed to have been faking her blindness, and is not the actual former leader's daughter. Furthermore, she is engaged to Leo, who has also been revealed to have been pretending to be an officer, and is really a Flying Daggers member. The Flying Daggers are not afraid of the military and are actually looking forward to an open battle. A heartbroken Leo tells Mei that he waited for her for three years since he went undercover to infiltrate the police, and asks how she could fall in love with Jin after only three days, only to be told she has her heart set on Jin.

Leo tries to attack Mei, but their superior Nia throws a dagger into Leo's back and reassigns them to new missions, separating them. Shortly after, Mei is told to execute Jin. She frees him instead but refuses to desert the House to join him. Later, Mei changes her mind and rides after Jin, but is ambushed by Leo, who casts two daggers at her. Mei manages to deflect one of them while the other pierces her and seemingly kills her. At this point, Jin discovers Leo and the two of them fight, but their skills are too evenly matched. A raging blizzard falls upon them, while the military approaches the House.

Finally, with both men badly wounded and exhausted, Leo pulls Nia's dagger out of his back and threatens to use it on Jin. Mei reappears and threatens to pull the dagger out of her breast and throw it at Leo, which would cause her to bleed to death, but Jin begs her to save herself. After several tense moments, Leo decides to pretend to throw his dagger, intending to die by Mei's dagger while sparing Jin. However, Mei attempts to use her dagger to intercept Leo's dagger in flight. The result is that neither Leo nor Jin dies, but only Mei. In the end, Leo stumbles away in guilt while Jin cries over Mei's body, singing a song praising her as a "rare beauty", the likes of which he will never see again. Whether the House won against the military is left ambiguous.

Cast
 Andy Lau – Captain Leo
 Zhang Ziyi – Mei
 Takeshi Kaneshiro – Captain Jin

Production
Anita Mui was originally cast for a major role, which was to be her final film appearance.  She died of cervical cancer before any of her scenes were filmed. After her death on 30 December 2003, director Zhang Yimou decided to alter the script rather than find a replacement. The film is dedicated to her memory.

To prepare for her role, Zhang Ziyi lived for two months with a blind girl who had lost her sight at the age of 12 because of a brain tumor. Takeshi Kaneshiro injured his leg when he went horseback riding. As a result, Yimou had Kaneshiro spend two scenes sitting or kneeling down to alleviate the pain, which was stated in Zhang Yimou's audio commentary.

Most of the film was shot in Ukraine's Carpathian Mountains (the Hutsul Region National Park), such as the scenes in the snow or birch forests. The cast and production team spent 70 days on location from September to October 2003 and were largely based in Kosiv. The notable bamboo forest sequences were filmed in China. However, due to the early snowfall, the filmmakers opted to alter the script and certain sequences rather than wait for the snow to thaw as the leaves were still on the trees. Director Zhang Yimou later stated that despite the unpredictable weather forcing the alterations, he had achieved the desired effect in the scenery and was happy with the final result.

Like its predecessor Hero, House of Flying Daggers uses wuxing color theory in both a deliberate and ironic manner.

Literary origins

The film features the theme of a beautiful woman who brings woe to two men.  This theme is borrowed from a famous poem written by the Han Dynasty poet Li Yannian:    ，     。
    ，     。
       。
    。

Release
Box office
House of Flying Daggers opened in North America on 3 December 2004 in 15 theatres. It grossed US$397,472 ($26,498 per screen) in its opening weekend. The film's total North American gross is $11,050,094. Afterwards, the film went on to earn at least 50% more in the United States home video market than at the theatrical box office.

The film made an additional US$81,751,003 elsewhere in the world, bringing its total worldwide box-office gross to $92,801,097. It was also the third-highest-grossing foreign-language film in the North America market in 2004.

Critical reception
House of Flying Daggers debuted in May at the 2004 Cannes Film Festival to enthusiastic receptions.  The film reportedly received a 20-minute standing ovation at its Cannes Film Festival premiere.

The film received critical acclaim.  At film review aggregation website Metacritic, the film received an average score of 89 out of 100, based on 37 reviews, indicating "universal acclaim".  Rotten Tomatoes gives the film a "Certified Fresh" score of 87%, based on reviews from 173 critics, and an average rating of 7.76/10. The website's critical consensus states, "The visual splendor of the movie makes up for the weak story". Metacritic also ranked the film at the end of the year as the fifth-best reviewed film of 2004.

Phil Hall of Film Threat wrote: "Quite simply, House of Flying Daggers is a film that sets several new standards for production and entertainment values. It is a wild riot of color, music, passion, action, mystery, pure old-fashioned thrills, and even dancing. With an endless supply of imagination and a kinetic force of nature in its amazing star Zhang Ziyi, House of Flying Daggers cuts all other films to shreds."  Desson Thomas of The Washington Post praised the director Zhang Yimou's use of color in the film as "simply the best in the world" and described the film as: "the slow-motion trajectory of a small bean, hurled from a police captain's hand, is a spectacular thing. It's a stunning, moving image, like a hummingbird caught in action."  While Kevin Thomas of the Los Angeles Times praised the film by stating: "House of Flying Daggers finds the great Chinese director at his most romantic in this thrilling martial arts epic that involves a conflict between love and duty carried out to its fullest expression."

A. O. Scott of The New York Times described the film as: "A gorgeous entertainment, a feast of blood, passion, and silk brocade."  The review also stated: "House of Flying Daggers for all its fire and beauty, may leave you a bit cold in the end."  Roger Ebert of the Chicago Sun Times gave the film four out of four stars and states: "Forget about the plot, the characters, the intrigue, which are all splendid in House of Flying Daggers, and focus just on the visuals", and Ebert also states: "the film is so good to look at and listen to that, as with some operas, the story is almost beside the point, serving primarily to get us from one spectacular scene to another." House of Flying Daggers was placed at number 93 on Slant Magazines best films of the 2000s. and ranked number 77 in Empires "The 100 Best Films Of World Cinema" in 2010.

 Home media 
In the United Kingdom, the film was watched by  viewers on Channel 4 in 2007, making it the year's most-watched foreign-language film on UK television. It was later watched by 600,000 UK viewers on Channel 4 in 2009, again making it the year's most-watched foreign-language film on Channel 4. Combined, the film drew a  UK viewership on Channel 4 in 2007 and 2009.

Accolades
Won
 Boston Film Critics Best Cinematography (Zhao Xiaoding)
 Best Director (Yimou Zhang)
 Best Foreign Language Film (China/Hong Kong)
 Los Angeles Film Critics Best Foreign Language Film (China/Hong Kong)
 Motion Picture Sound Editors Best Sound Editing in Foreign Features
 National Board of Review Outstanding Production Design
 National Society of Film Critics 
 Best Director (Yimou Zhang)
 Best Cinematography (Zhao Xiaoding) 
 Satellite Awards Best Cinematography (Zhao Xiaoding) 
 Best Visual Effects

Nominations
 24th Hong Kong Film Awards Best Asian Film
 Academy Awards Best Cinematography (Zhao Xiaoding)
 Academy of Science Fiction, Fantasy and Horror Films Best Actress (Zhang Ziyi)
 Best Costumes (Emi Wada)
 Best Director (Zhang Yimou)
 Best Fantasy Film
 BAFTA Awards Best Achievement in Special Visual Effects (Angie Lam, Andy Brown, Kirsty Millar, and Luke Hetherington)
 Best Cinematography (Zhao Xiaoding)
 Best Costume Design (Emi Wada)
 Best Editing (Long Cheng)
 Best Film not in the English Language (William Kong and Zhang Yimou)
 Best Make Up/Hair (Lee-na Kwan, Xiaohai Yang and Siu-Mui Chau)
 Best Performance by an Actress in a Leading Role (Zhang Ziyi)
 Best Production Design (Huo Tingxiao)
 Best Sound (Tao Jing and Roger Savage)
 Golden Eagle Awards Best Foreign Language Film
 London Film Critics Circle Film of the Year
 Director of the Year (Zhang Yimou)
 Foreign language film of the year
 Satellite Awards Best Art Direction/Production Design (Zhong Han) 
 Best Costume Design (Emi Wada) 
 Best Film Editing (Long Cheng) 
 Best Motion Picture – Foreign Film (China)
 Best Sound (Editing and Mixing) (Jing Tao)
 Broadcast Film Critics Association Awards Best Foreign-Language Film
 Online Film Critics Society Awards Best Cinematography (Xiaoding Zhao) 
 Best Editing (Long Cheng) 
 Best Foreign Language Film (China) 
 European Film Awards' Best Non-European Film – Prix Screen International

Soundtrack

The soundtrack was produced and created by Shigeru Umebayashi, featuring vocals by Zhang Ziyi and Kathleen Battle. It was released in Hong Kong on 15 July 2004 by the film's production company and distributor Edko Films. The US version was released by Sony Music Entertainment on 7 December 2004.

 "Opening Title" – 0:58
 "Beauty Song" (佳人曲) – 2:32 (Zhang Ziyi)
 "The Echo Game" – 1:17
 The Peonyhouse – 1:22
 "Battle in the Forest" – 3:26
 "Taking Her Hand" – 1:14
 "Leo's Eyes" – 1:51
 "Lovers-Flower Garden" – 2:19
 "No Way Out" – 3:59
 "Lovers" – 1:54
 "Farewell No. 1" – 2:42
 "Bamboo Forest" – 2:36
 "Ambush in Ten Directions" (十面埋伏) – 2:01
 "Leo's Theme" – 2:36
 "Mei and Leo" – 3:06
 "The House of Flying Daggers" – 1:27
 "Lovers-Mei and Jin" – 4:21
 "Farewell No. 2" – 2:49
 "Until The End " – 2:55
 "Title Song Lovers''" – 4:12 (Kathleen Battle)

See also

 List of historical drama films of Asia

References

External links
 
 
 
 

2004 films
2000s Mandarin-language films
2000s romance films
2004 martial arts films
Chinese epic films
Chinese romance films
Chinese martial arts films
Hong Kong action films
Hong Kong epic films
Hong Kong romance films
Hong Kong martial arts films
Films directed by Zhang Yimou
Films set in 9th-century Tang dynasty
Films shot in Ukraine
Martial arts fantasy films
Wuxia films
Films scored by Shigeru Umebayashi
Columbia Pictures films
Sony Pictures Classics films
2000s Hong Kong films